San Miguel is a district of the Naranjo canton, in the Alajuela province of Costa Rica.

Geography 
San Miguel has an area of  km2 and an elevation of  metres.

Demographics 

For the 2011 census, San Miguel had a population of  inhabitants.

Transportation

Road transportation 
The district is covered by the following road routes:
 National Route 1
 National Route 141
 National Route 715

References 

Districts of Alajuela Province
Populated places in Alajuela Province